The Canossians are a family of two Catholic religious institutes and three affiliated lay associations that trace their origin to Magdalen of Canossa, a religious sister canonized by Pope John Paul II in 1988.

Canossian family

Canossian Daughters of Charity, Servants of the Poor (FDCC)
The Canossian Daughters of Charity (Canossian Sisters), is a Catholic religious institute founded by Magdalen of Canossa in Verona, Italy, in 1808. On February 27, 1860, six Canossian Sisters from Venice and Padua began their journey to Hong Kong arriving there on April 12, 1860. From there the sisters went to Macau and then to Southeast Asia.

Today they count eighteen provinces with approximately 2,700 Sisters in more than 336 communities and in 32 countries around the world. Their primary works of charity include education, catechesis, and care of the sick. The General House is in Rome. (FDCC is the Italian abbreviation of "Figlie Della Carità Canossiane").

ENCA or Enlace Canossiano America (Canossian Network in America) is the union of the three Canossian Provinces in America: Brazil, Argentina and North America. It includes all the Canossian Sisters residing in America.

Since 1988 the sisters help with pastoral work, teaching and hospital visitation the Chinese Community and the new Chinese immigrants at St. Francis Xavier Church in Richmond in the Archdiocese of Vancouver, British Columbia.

In the United States the Canossian Daughters of Charity run a retreat center, the Canossian Spirituality Center in Albuquerque, New Mexico.

The Sisters in Macau spread out to other countries in Southeast Asia towards the end of the 19th century.

In 1894 mainly Italian and Portuguese-speaking Sisters arrived at the Portuguese Mission at St. Joseph's Church in Singapore (then part of the Straits Settlements) and expanded to Malaya, both of which were part of the British Empire. As of 2008 the Sisters are the largest religious orders in the Archdiocese of Singapore and operate three mainstream schools – St Anthony's Canossian Primary & Secondary School & Canossa Catholic Primary School; two pre-schools/kindergartens, one special school for the deaf and two homes for the Aged Sick providing palliative care. In addition, the Sisters offer retreats and spiritual direction. In the Philippines, Mother Anna Bautista led a group of sisters and founded the first mission and school in the country in 1954.

Canossian Sons of Charity (FdCC)
The Canossian Sons of Charity, (Canossian Fathers), were founded in Venice in 1831. They count today about 200 brothers and priests dedicated to the education of children and young people through catechesis in schools, orphanages, youth centers (oratories) and other works of charity towards the poor and the least. They are present in Italy, Brazil, Kenya, Tanzania, India and the Philippines. (FdCC means "Figli della Carità Canossiani").

In 1986 upon the invitation of the late Cardinal Jaime Sin, Archbishop of Manila, the Canossian Fathers in Italy sent two priests to start a mission and to open a seminary.

Affiliates
  Association of Lay Canossians (ALC)  (Canossian Tertiaries or Collaborators) are married and unmarried lay men and women of diverse nationalities who feel called to live the charism and the spirituality of the Canossian Family in their personal, family and social life. They received their "Plan for the Tertiaries" in 1835 and today serve in Asia, Europe, Oceania, Africa and the Americas. They are counting about 2,150 members. (ALC stands for "Associazione Laici Canossiani").  
Canossian Alumni Association, a membership society registered in Singapore for former students of the various Canossian schools in Singapore.
  Canossian Foundation (ONLUS), established in 2004 in Rome, is a legal non-profit entity for human development, to promote, coordinate and sustain initiatives that favour the poorest and the most excluded in the world and also to raise funds for the Canossian Missions in Brazil, the Philippines, India, and Africa. (ONLUS in Italian stands for "Organizzazione Non Lucrativa di Utilità Sociale").
  International Canossian Voluntary Service (VOICA) (Canossian Volunteers) was legally established in 1996 to support and direct young people and adults from all parts of the world who are seeking to deepen the meaning and purpose of their lives by a personal experience of shared community life in a short or long term voluntary service of the poor. They are presently sharing in Canossian missionary projects in Togo, Congo, Uganda, Albania, Indonesia, Angola, Paraguay and Brasil. (VOICA is the abbreviation of "Volontariato Internazionale CAnossiano").

Schools

Hong Kong
Canossa College (formerly Canossian Convent Secondary School)
Canossa Primary School
Canossa School 
Holy Angels Canossian School
Holy Family Canossian College
Holy Family Canossian School (Kowloon Tong)
Holy Family Canossian School
Pui Tak Canossian College
Sacred Heart Canossian College
Sacred Heart Canossian School
St. Francis' Canossian College
St. Francis' Canossian School
St. Mary's Canossian College

Australia
Canossa School in Ingham, Queensland

India
 Canossa Convent High School in Andheri
 Canossa Convent High School in Dhule
 Canossa Convent High School in Mahim
 Canossa Convent School in Faizabad, Uttar Pradesh
 Canossa School in Lucknow
 Canossa, Vasai
 Elementary School "English Together"] in Bareilly
 St. Joseph's College for Women in Alappuzha
 St. Josephs school Belgaum
 St. Philomena's Girls High School] in Poonthura

Macau
Sacred Heart Canossian College

Malaysia
Sekolah Kebangsaan Canossian Convent, Kluang
Sekolah Kebangsaan Canossian Convent, Segamat
Sekolah Kebangsaan Sacred Heart Convent, Malacca
Sekolah Menengah Kebangsaan Canossa Convent, Malacca
Sekolah Menengah Kebangsaan Canossian Convent, Kluang
Sekolah Menengah Kebangsaan Canossian Convent, Segamat

Singapore
 Canossa Catholic Primary School
Canossaville Pre-school 
Canossian Kindergarten
Canossian School (for the deaf)
 Saint Anthony's Canossian Primary School], Bedok
Saint Anthony's Canossian Secondary School

Philippines
 Canossa Academy in Calamba, Laguna
 Canossa Academy in Lipa, Batangas
 Canossa College in San Pablo, Laguna
 Canossa School in Santa Rosa, Laguna

Hospitals
Canossa Health and Social Center Bulihan, Silang, Cavite, Philippines
Canossa Hospital (Caritas)
Canossa Private Hospital, Oxley, Brisbane, Australia
Dispensary Saint Josephine Bakhita in Agoe, Togo

Saints
The foundress of the Canossians, Magdalen of Canossa (1774–1835), was canonized a saint on 2 October 1988 by Pope John Paul II. Mother Josephine Bakhita of Sudan (1869–1947) was also named a Canossian saint on 1 October 2000 by Pope John Paul II.

Members proposed for sainthood
Canossian Daughters and Sons of Charity who are proposed for canonization by the Church include:

 Servant of God Dalisay Lazaga Lazaga's cause was opened on June 28, 2012, by the Congregation for the Causes of Saints.
 Servant of God Luigia Grassi
 Servant of God Teresa Pera: Teresa Pera was born on February 16, 1870, in Turin, Italy, became a professed religious of the Canossian Daughters of Charity. She died on June 26, 1938, in Besozzo, Varese, Italy. Her cause was opened for the decree for heroic virtue.
 Venerable Fernanda Riva: Riva was born on May 1, 1920, in Monza, Italy, She became a Canossian Daughters of Charity and went to India. She died on January 22, 1956, in Mumbai (a.k.a. Bombay), Maharashtra, India. She was venerated on June 28, 2012, by Pope Benedict XVI for the decree of heroic virtue.

Members
Esmeralda Rego de Jesus Araujo

References

External links
 Association of Lay Canossians
 Canossian Daughters of Charity website
 Canossian Sons of Charity website
Canossian Daughters of Charity (Rome)
Canossian Daughters of Charity (Singapore and Myanmar)
Canossian Daughters of Charity (USA)
Canossian Sons of Charity (Philippines)
Canossian Spirituality Center in Albuquerque, NM
International Canossian Voluntary Service (VOICA)
Magdalena of Canossa

 
Catholic religious institutes established in the 19th century
1828 establishments in the Papal States